Axel Lindahl (born 4 April 1995) is a Swedish football midfielder who plays for Kalmar.

Honours
Bodø/Glimt
Eliteserien: 2021

References

1995 births
Living people
Swedish footballers
Association football midfielders
Oskarshamns AIK players
Jönköpings Södra IF players
Degerfors IF players
FK Bodø/Glimt players
Ettan Fotboll players
Superettan players
Eliteserien players
Swedish expatriate footballers
Expatriate footballers in Norway
Swedish expatriate sportspeople in Norway